Wytaliba is a community in north-east New South Wales. It is located next to the Mann River, between the Mann River Nature Reserve and Barool National Park, about 40 km east of Glen Innes, and has a population of around 100.

History
Wytaliba started as a commune in the 1970s.

Facilities
Wytaliba has a public school with an enrolment of about 10 students.

Glen Innes Fire
In November 2019 a bushfire swept through Wytaliba. Two people were killed and many structures, including the school, were partially or wholly destroyed.

References

Populated places established in the 1970s
Localities in New South Wales
Northern Tablelands
Glen Innes Severn